Jack Lambert (born 19 March 1999) is an English professional footballer who plays as a midfielder for  club Darlington. He began his career in Middlesbrough's youth system, made his senior debut in the Scottish Premiership with Dundee, and after joining Scunthorpe United in 2019, spent time on loan at National League North clubs Darlington (two spells) and Blyth Spartans. He spent a short spell in Icelandic football with ÍBV before returning to English non-league football with Hebburn Town. Lambert rejoined Darlington in 2021.

Club career
Lambert came through Middlesbrough's youth system, before joining Scottish Premiership club Dundee in 2017. He made his professional debut at home to Celtic on 26 December 2017, replacing Faissal El Bakhtaoui after an hour of the 2–0 league defeat, and signed a new contract in January 2018. Lambert made five Premiership appearances for Dundee, seven in all first-team competitions, before he was released at the end of the 2018–19 season.

Lambert returned to England and signed for League Two club Scunthorpe United in July 2019, as part of their under-23 side. He joined National League North club Darlington on 15 November on a month's loan, and made his debut the following day as a half-time substitute with his new team already 5–0 down away to Brackley Town. The loan was extended for a second month, and he made eight league appearances before returning to his parent club. After a month on loan at another National League North club, Blyth Spartans, during which he made three league starts, he returned to Darlington on 6 March 2020 for the rest of the season, but was not used in either of the matches played before the season was curtailed because of the COVID-19 pandemic. He was released by Scunthorpe at the end of the season.

On 7 September 2020, Lambert joined Icelandic 1. deild side ÍBV until the end of the season, but the league was suspended and then abandoned in October because of COVID-19, by which time he had scored once from three matches.

Lambert joined Hebburn Town on 13 March 2021 until the end of the season. Although the Northern League campaign had already been abandoned, he played twice in the 2020–21 FA Vase, but not in the 2020 FA Vase Final, rescheduled from the end of the previous season, in which Hebburn beat Consett 3–2 at Wembley.

In September 2021, he rejoined Darlington on non-contract terms. On 12 November, after two goals from seven league appearances, he signed a contract with Darlington. He finished the season with eight goals from 35 appearances in all competitions.

Career statistics

Honours
Individual
National League North Player of the Month: November 2022

References

External links
 

1999 births
Living people
Footballers from Newcastle upon Tyne
English footballers
Association football midfielders
Middlesbrough F.C. players
Dundee F.C. players
Scunthorpe United F.C. players
Darlington F.C. players
Blyth Spartans A.F.C. players
Íþróttabandalag Vestmannaeyja players
Hebburn Town F.C. players
Scottish Professional Football League players
National League (English football) players
1. deild karla players
English expatriate footballers
English expatriate sportspeople in Iceland
Expatriate footballers in Iceland